Ye Olde Murenger House is a 19th-century pub with a  mock Tudor front on High Street, Newport, Wales. It replaced a 17th-century pub, the Fleur de Lys, on the same site. It is named after the medieval job of a murenger, a  person who collected tolls for the repair of the town walls, and is Grade II listed due to its historic interest to the immediate area.

History
The pub takes its name from the job of a murenger, a medieval person who collected tolls for the building or repair of town walls. The taxes were called a murage.

A building on this site was first mentioned in 1533, a town house for the Herbert family of St Julians Manor. By the 17th century, it had become a pub called the Fleur de Lys. According to Cadw the original building was a single-storey stone structure, which was demolished in 1816 and replaced by the current public house, established in 1819. A photo taken around 1900 shows the distinctive mock Tudor jetties did not exist at the time and these were added after this date.

It became a Grade II listed building in 1951 because of its historic interest to the immediate area. In a poor state of repair in the 1970s, the pub was taken over by Sam Smith's in 1980, repaired and re-opened in 1983. In 2014 Ye Olde Murenger was suggested as a candidate for the Old Kent Road space on a Newport version of the board game Monopoly.

Description
The pub has three jettied storeys plus an attic with the gable facing the street. The latter has a three-light casement window. The first and second storeys have broad oriel windows flanked by square panelling with a close studded band below. The facade of the ground floor is an early twentieth-century public house front on the left with a six-light window on the right side.
It has a painting of the former undefeated British heavyweight champion boxer David 'Bomber' Pearce.

References

Music venues in Newport, Wales
Commercial buildings completed in the 19th century
Grade II listed pubs in Wales
Grade II listed buildings in Newport, Wales
Culture in Newport, Wales
Landmarks in Newport, Wales